Leiocephalus partitus, commonly known as the Guanica curlytail, was a species of lizard in the family Leiocephalidae (curly-tailed lizard). It was native to Puerto Rico.

References

Leiocephalus
Reptiles described in 1981
Reptiles of Puerto Rico
Taxa named by Gregory Pregill